Fernao Veloso Bay is a bay in Mozambique. It is located in Nampula Province, south of Memba Bay on the northern coast of Mozambique.

Currently the bay is a popular tourist area, having some fine beaches and diving spots.

Geography
Fernao Veloso Bay is open towards the east and has deep inlets in the northwestern and southwestern corners of the inner bay. The latter runs from north to south and forms the harbour of Nacala, the deepest natural port on the east coast of Africa.

See also
 Geography of Mozambique

References

External links
Nacala. Baía de Fernão Veloso.

Bays of the Indian Ocean
Bays of Mozambique